New York Dolls were an American rock band formed in New York City in 1971. Along with the Velvet Underground and the Stooges, they were one of the first bands of the early punk rock scenes. Although the band never achieved much commercial success and their original line-up fell apart quickly, the band's first two albums—New York Dolls (1973) and Too Much Too Soon (1974)—became among the most popular cult records in rock. The line-up at this time consisted of, vocalist David Johansen, guitarist Johnny Thunders, bassist Arthur Kane, guitarist and pianist Sylvain Sylvain, and drummer Jerry Nolan; the latter two had replaced Rick Rivets and Billy Murcia, respectively, in 1972. On stage, they donned an androgynous wardrobe, wearing high heels, eccentric hats, satin, makeup, spandex, and dresses. Nolan described the group in 1974 as "the Dead End Kids of today".

According to the Encyclopedia of Popular Music (1995), the New York Dolls predated the punk and glam metal movements and were "one of the most influential rock bands of the last 20 years". They influenced rock groups such as Kiss, The Ramones, the Sex Pistols, Guns N' Roses, The Damned, and The Smiths, whose frontman Morrissey organized a reunion show for the New York Dolls' surviving members in 2004. After reuniting, they recruited new musicians to tour and record.  They released three more albums—One Day It Will Please Us to Remember Even This (2006), Cause I Sez So (2009) and Dancing Backward in High Heels (2011). Following a 2011 British tour with Alice Cooper, the band once again disbanded.

History

Formation 

Sylvain Sylvain and Billy Murcia, who went to junior high school and high school together, started playing in a band called "the Pox" in 1967. After the frontman quit, Murcia and Sylvain started a clothing business called Truth and Soul and Sylvain took a job at A Different Drummer, a men's boutique that was across the street from the New York Doll Hospital, a doll repair shop. Sylvain said that the shop inspired the name for their future band. In 1970 they formed a band again and recruited Johnny Thunders to join on bass, though Sylvain ended up teaching him to play guitar. They called themselves the Dolls. When Sylvain left the band to spend a few months in London, Thunders and Murcia went their separate ways.

Thunders was eventually recruited by Kane and Rick Rivets, who had been playing together in the Bronx. At Thunders' suggestion, Murcia replaced the original drummer. Thunders played lead guitar and sang for the band Actress. An October 1971 rehearsal tape recorded by Rivets was released as Dawn of the Dolls. When Thunders decided that he no longer wanted to be the front man, David Johansen joined the band. Initially, the group was composed of singer David Johansen, guitarists Johnny Thunders and Rick Rivets (who was replaced by Sylvain Sylvain after a few months), bass guitarist Arthur "Killer" Kane and drummer Billy Murcia.

The original line-up's first performance was on Christmas Eve 1971 at a homeless shelter, the Endicott Hotel. After getting a manager and attracting some music industry interest, the New York Dolls got a break when Rod Stewart invited them to open for him at a London concert.

In the band's early days, the New York Dolls performed at the Mercer Art Center, where Ruby and the Rednecks opened for and were influenced by them.

Billy Murcia's death
While on a brief tour of England in 1972, Murcia was invited to a party, where he passed out from an accidental overdose. He was put in a bathtub and force-fed coffee in an attempt to revive him. Instead, it resulted in asphyxiation. He was found dead on the morning of November 6, 1972, at the age of 21.

Record deal: 1972–1975 

Once back in New York, the Dolls auditioned drummers, including Marc Bell (who was to go on to play with Richard Hell, and with the Ramones under the stage name "Marky Ramone"), Peter Criscuola (better known as Peter Criss, the original and former drummer of Kiss), and Jerry Nolan, a friend of the band. They selected Nolan, and after US Mercury Records' A&R man Paul Nelson signed them, they began sessions for their debut album. In 1972, the band took on Marty Thau as manager.

New York Dolls was produced by singer-songwriter, musician and solo artist Todd Rundgren. In an interview in Creem magazine, Rundgren says he barely touched the recording; everybody was debating how to do the mix. Sales were sluggish, especially in the middle US, and a Stereo Review magazine reviewer in 1973 compared the Dolls' guitar playing to the sound of lawnmowers. America's mass rock audience's reaction to the Dolls was mixed. In a Creem magazine poll, they were elected both best and worst new group of 1973. The Dolls also toured Europe, and, while appearing on UK television, host Bob Harris of the BBC's Old Grey Whistle Test derided the group as "mock rock," comparing them unfavorably to the Rolling Stones.

For their next album, Too Much Too Soon, the quintet hired producer George "Shadow" Morton, whose productions for the Shangri-Las and other girl-groups in the mid-1960s had been among the band's favorites.

Dissolution: 1975–1976 

By 1975, the Dolls were playing smaller venues than they had been previously. Drug and alcohol abuse by Thunders, Nolan, and Kane, as well as artistic differences added to the tensions among members. In late February or early March, Malcolm McLaren became their informal manager. He got the band red leather outfits to wear on stage and a communist flag as backdrop. The Dolls did a five-concert tour of New York's five boroughs, supported by Television and Pure Hell.  The Little Hippodrome (Manhattan) show was recorded and released by Fan Club records in 1982 as Red Patent Leather. It was originally a bootleg album that was later remixed by Sylvain, with former manager Marty Thau credited as executive producer. Due to Kane being unable to play that night, roadie Peter Jordan played bass, though he was credited as having played "second bass". Jordan filled in for Kane when he was too inebriated to play.

In March and April, McLaren took the band on a tour of South Carolina and Florida. Jordan replaced Kane for most of those shows. Thunders and Nolan left after an argument. Blackie Lawless, who later founded W.A.S.P., replaced Thunders for the remainder of the tour after which the band broke up.

The band reformed in July for an August tour in Japan with Jeff Beck and Felix Pappalardi. Johansen, Sylvain and Jordan were joined by former Elephant's Memory keyboardist Chris Robison and drummer Tony Machine. One of the shows was documented on the album Tokyo Dolls Live (Fan Club/New Rose). The material is similar to that on Red Patent Leather, but notable for a radically re-arranged "Frankenstein" and a cover of Big Joe Turner's "Flip Flop Fly." The album is undated and has no production credit, but was issued circa 1986.

After their return to New York, the Dolls resumed playing shows in the US and Canada. Mercury dropped the Dolls on 7 October 1975, their contract with Mercury having expired on 8 August 1975 - five months after Thunders' and Nolan's departures from the band.
Their show at the Beacon Theatre, on New Year's Eve, 1975 met with great critical acclaim. After a drunken argument with Sylvain, Robison was fired and replaced by pianist/keyboardist Bobbie Blaine formerly a member of Street Punk. The group toured throughout 1976, performing a set including some songs with lyrics by David Johansen that would later appear on David Johansen's solo albums including "Funky But Chic", "Frenchette" and "Wreckless Crazy." The group played its last show December 30, 1976 at Max's Kansas City; on the same bill as Blondie.

Individual endeavors: 1975–2004 

Shortly after returning from Florida, Thunders and Nolan formed The Heartbreakers with bassist Richard Hell, who had left Television the same week that they quit the Dolls. Thunders later pursued a solo career. He died in New Orleans on 23 April 1991, allegedly of an overdose of both heroin and methadone. It also came to light that he suffered from t-cell leukemia. Nolan died on 14 January 1992 following a stroke, brought about by bacterial meningitis.  In 1976, Kane and Blackie Lawless formed the Killer Kane Band in Los Angeles. Immediately after the New York Dolls' second breakup, Johansen began a solo career.  By the late 1980s, he achieved moderate success under the pseudonym, Buster Poindexter.  Sylvain formed The Criminals, a popular band at CBGB.

A posthumous New York Dolls album, Lipstick Killers, made up of early demo tapes of the original Dolls (with Billy Murcia on drums), was released in a cassette-only edition on ROIR Records in 1981, and subsequently re-released on CD, and then on vinyl in early 2006. All the tracks from this title – sometimes referred to as The Mercer Street Sessions (though actually recorded at Blue Rock Studio, New York) – are included on the CD Private World, along with other tracks recorded elsewhere, including a previously unreleased Dolls original, "Endless Party." Three more unreleased studio tracks, including another previously unreleased Dolls original, "Lone Star Queen," are included on the Rock 'n' Roll album. The other two are covers: the "Courageous Cat" theme, from the original Courageous Cat cartoon series; and a second attempt at "Don't Mess With Cupid," a song written by Steve Cropper and Eddie Floyd for Otis Redding, and first recorded independently for what was later to become the Mercer Street/Blue Rock Sessions.

Sylvain formed his own band, The Criminals, then cut a solo album for RCA, while also working with Johansen. He later became a taxicab driver in New York.

Johansen, meanwhile, formed the David Johansen Group, and released an eponymous LP in 1978, recorded at the Bottom Line in NYC's Greenwich Village,featuring Sylvain Mizrahi and Johnny Thunders as guest musicians.

In May, 1978, he also released  "David Johansen," on Blue Sky Records, a label created by Steve Paul, formerly of The Scene. Johansen continued to tour with his solo project and released four more albums,  In Style, 1979; Here Comes the Night, 1981; Live it Up, 1982; and Sweet Revenge, 1984.

During the later 1980's, Johansen, ever-evolving, decided to try to liberate himself from the expectations of his New York Dolls perceived persona, and, on a whim, created the persona Buster Poindexter.

The success of this act led him to be invited to appear in multiple films: Scrooged, Freejack, and Let it Ride, among others.

He also formed a band called David Johansen and the Harry Smiths, named after the eccentric ethnomusicologist, performing jump blues, Delta blues, and some original songs.

During this period, in the early 1990s, Sylvain moved to Los Angeles and recorded one album Sleep Baby Doll, on Fishhead Records. His band, for that record, consisted of Brian Keats on drums, Dave Vanian's Phantom Chords, Speediejohn Carlucci (who had played with the Fuzztones), and Olivier Le Baron on lead guitar. Guest appearances by Frank Infante of Blondie and Derwood Andrews of Generation X were also included on the record. It has been re-released as New York A Go Go,.

Reunion, return to recording, second dissolution: 2004–11, and death of Sylvain 

Morrissey, having been a longtime fan of the band and head of their 1970s UK fan club, organized a reunion of the three surviving members of the band's classic line-up (Johansen, Sylvain and Kane) for the Meltdown Festival in London on June 16, 2004. The reunion led to a live LP and DVD on Morrissey's Attack label, as well as a documentary film, New York Doll, on the life of Arthur Kane. However, future plans for the Dolls were affected by Kane's sudden death from leukemia just weeks later on July 13, 2004. Yet the following month the band appeared at Little Steven's Underground Garage Festival on August 14 in New York City before returning to the UK to play several more festivals through the remainder of 2004.

In July 2005, the two surviving members announced a tour and a new album entitled One Day It Will Please Us to Remember Even This. Released on July 25, 2006, the album featured guitarist Steve Conte, bassist Sami Yaffa (ex-Hanoi Rocks), drummer Brian Delaney and keyboardist Brian Koonin, formerly a member of David Johansen and the Harry Smiths.  On July 20, 2006, the New York Dolls appeared on Late Night with Conan O'Brien, followed by a live performance in Philadelphia at the WXPN All About The Music Festival, and on July 22, 2006, a taped appearance on The Henry Rollins Show. On August 18, 2006, the band performed in a free concert at New York's Seaport Music.

In October 2006, the band embarked on a UK tour, with Sylvain taking time while in Glasgow to speak to John Kilbride of STV. The discussion covered the band's history and the current state of their live show and songwriting, with Sylvain commenting that "even if you come to our show thinking 'how can it be like it was before,' we turn that around 'cos we've got such a great live rock 'n roll show". In November 2006, the Dolls began headlining "Little Steven's Underground Garage Presents the Rolling Rock and Roll Show," about 20 live gigs with numerous other bands. In April 2007, the band played in Australia and New Zealand, appearing at the V Festival with Pixies, Pet Shop Boys, Gnarls Barkley, Beck, Jarvis Cocker and Phoenix.

On September 22, 2007, New York Dolls were removed from the current artists section of Roadrunner Records' website, signifying the group's split with the label. The band played the O2 Wireless Festival in Hyde Park, London on July 4, 2008, with Morrissey and Beck and the Lounge On The Farm Festival on July 12, 2008. On November 14, 2008, it was announced that the producer of their first album, Todd Rundgren, would be producing a new album, which would be followed by a world tour. The finishing touches on the album were made in Rundgren's studio on the island of Kauai. The album, Cause I Sez So, was released on May 5, 2009 on Atco Records.

The band played at South by Southwest in Austin, Texas on March 21, 2009, and a show at London's 100 Club on May 14, 2009 supported by Spizzenergi.
On March 18, 2010, the band announced another two concert dates at KOKO in Camden, London and the Academy in Dublin on April 20. In December 2010, it was announced the band would release their fifth album which had been recorded in Newcastle upon Tyne. The album, Dancing Backward in High Heels, featuring new guitarist Frank Infante (formerly of Blondie) was released on March 15, 2011.

On March 1, 2011, it was announced the New York Dolls would be the opening act for a summer tour featuring Mötley Crüe and Poison. They announced a new lineup for the tour, featuring guitarist Earl Slick, who held previous stints with David Bowie and John Lennon, bassist Kenny Aaronson, who had toured with Bob Dylan, and drummer Jason Sutter, formerly of Foreigner.

In a 2016 interview, Earl Slick confirmed the band was over. "Oh, yeah, it's long gone. There was no point in doing it anymore and it was kinda spent. You know, David really does enjoy the Buster thing. He's so good at it. I've seen him do it a couple of times this last year, and man! He's got it down, you know."

Sylvain Sylvain died on January 13, 2021, at age 69, leaving David Johansen as the last surviving original member of the band.

Musical style 

According to AllMusic editor Stephen Thomas Erlewine, the New York Dolls developed an original style of hard rock that presaged both punk rock and heavy metal music, and drew on elements such as the "dirty rock & roll" of the Rolling Stones, the "anarchic noise" of the Stooges, the glam rock of David Bowie and T. Rex, and girl group pop music. Erlewine credited the band for creating punk rock "before there was a term for it." Ken Tucker, who referred to them as a proto-punk band, wrote that they were strongly influenced by the "New York sensibility" of Lou Reed: "The mean wisecracks and impassioned cynicism that informed the Dolls' songs represented an attitude that Reed's work with the Velvet Underground embodied, as did the Dolls' distinct lack of musicianship."

When they began performing, four of the band's five members wore Spandex and platform boots, while Johansen—the band's lyricist and "conceptmaster"— often preferred high heels and a dress occasionally. Fashion historian Valerie Steele said that, while the majority of the punk scene pursued an understated "street look", the New York Dolls followed an English glam rock "look of androgyny—leather and knee-length boots, chest hair, and bleach". According to James McNair of The Independent, "when they began pedalling  their trashy glam-punk around lower Manhattan in 1971, they were more burlesque act than band; a bunch of lipsticked, gutter chic-endorsing cross-dressers". Music journalist Nick Kent argued that the New York Dolls were "quintessential glam rockers" because of their flamboyant fashion, while their technical shortcomings as musicians and Johnny Thunders' "trouble-prone presence" gave them a punk-rock reputation.

By contrast, Robert Christgau preferred for them to not be categorized as a glam rock band, but instead as "the best hard-rock band since the Rolling Stones". Robert Hilburn, writing for the Los Angeles Times, said that the band exhibited a strong influence from the Rolling Stones, but had distinguished themselves by Too Much Too Soon (1974) as "a much more independent, original force" because of their "definite touch of the humor and carefreeness of early (ie. mid-1950s) rock". Simon Reynolds felt that, by their 2009 album Cause I Sez So, the band exhibited the sound "not of the sloppy, rambunctious Dolls of punk mythology but of a tight, lean hard-rock band."

Band members 

Former members

David Johansen – vocals, harmonica (1971–1976, 2004–2011)
Sylvain Sylvain – guitar, bass, piano, vocals (1971–1976, 2004–2011; died 2021)
Arthur Kane – bass guitar (1971–1975, 2004; died 2004)
Johnny Thunders - guitar, vocals (1971-1975; died 1991)
Billy Murcia – drums (1971–1972; died 1972)
Rick Rivets – guitar (1971; died 2019)
Jerry Nolan – drums (1972–1975; died 1992)
Peter Jordan – bass (1975–1976)
Tony Machine – drums (1975–1976)
Blackie Lawless – guitar (1976)
Chris Robison – keyboards (1975)
Bobby Blaine – keyboards (1976)

Steve Conte – guitar, vocals (2004–2010)
John Conte – bass (2004)
Gary Powell – drums (2004)
Brian Delaney– drums (2005–2011)
Sami Yaffa – bass (2005–2010)
Brian Koonin – keyboards (2005–2006)
Aaron Lee Tasjan - guitar (2008-2009)
Frank Infante – guitar (2010–2011)
Jason Hill – bass (2010–2011)
Jason Sutter – drums (2011)
Kenny Aaronson – bass (2011)
Earl Slick – guitar (2011)
Claton Pitcher – guitar (2011)

Timeline

Discography

Studio albums
Chart placings shown are from the Billboard 200 US Albums chart.
New York Dolls (1973 US:#116)
Too Much Too Soon (1974 US:#167) in UK:#165
One Day It Will Please Us to Remember Even This (2006 US:#129)
Cause I Sez So (2009 US:#159)
Dancing Backward in High Heels (2011)

Demo albums
Lipstick Killers – The Mercer Street Sessions 1972 (1981)
Seven Day Weekend (1992)
Actress – "Birth of the New York Dolls" (2000)
Endless Party (2000)
Private World - The Complete Early Studio Demos 1972–1973 (2006)

Live albums
Red Patent Leather (1984)
Paris Le Trash (1993)
Live In Concert, Paris 1974 (1998)
The Glamorous Life Live (1999)
From Paris with Love (L.U.V.) (2002)
Morrissey Presents: The Return Of New York Dolls Live From Royal Festival Hall (2004)
Live At the Filmore East (2008)
Viva Le Trash '74 (2009)
French Kiss '74 (2013)

Compilation albums
New York Dolls / Too Much Too Soon (1977)
Very Best of New York Dolls (1977)
Night of the Living Dolls (1985)
The Best of the New York Dolls (1985)
Super Best Collection (1990)
Rock'n Roll (1994)
Hootchie Kootchie Dolls (1998)
The Glam Rock Hits (1999)
Actress: Birth of The New York Dolls (2000)
Endless Party (2000)
New York Tapes 72/73 (2000)
Great Big Kiss (reissue of Seven Day Weekend and Red Patent Leather, 2002)
Looking For A Kiss (2003)
Manhattan Mayhem (2003)
20th Century Masters – the Millennium collection: the best of New York Dolls (2003)

Singles
"Personality Crisis" / "Looking for a Kiss" (1973)
"Trash" / "Personality Crisis" (1973)
"Jet Boy" / "Vietnamese Baby" (1973)
"Stranded in the Jungle" / "Don't Start Me Talkin'" (1974)
"(There's Gonna Be A) Showdown" / "Puss 'n' Boots" (1974)
"Jet Boy" // "Babylon" / "Who Are the Mystery Girls" (1977, UK)
"Bad Girl" / "Subway Train" (1978, Germany)
"Gimme Luv and Turn On the Light" (2006)
"Fool for You Baby" (2011)
"Dolled UP" (2014)

References

External links
 
 
 
 "Private World: New York Dolls Manager Marty Thau on His Days with the Band" - Interview in Rocker Magazine 2012

1971 establishments in New York City
2011 disestablishments in New York (state)
Hard rock musical groups from New York (state)
American glam rock musical groups
Protopunk groups
Punk rock groups from New York (state)
Musical groups from New York City
Mercury Records artists
Musical groups established in 1971
Musical groups disestablished in 1976
Musical groups reestablished in 2004
Musical groups disestablished in 2011
Atco Records artists